Evidelia González Jarquin (born 20 November 1997) is a Nicaraguan rower. She competed in the 2020 Summer Olympics. She was one of the eight athletes who represented Nicaragua in these games, as well as the first Nicaraguan woman to compete in the rowing discipline. In 2018, Ana Vanegas and Evidelia González won bronze in the double scull competition at the Central American and Caribbean Games in Barranquilla, Colombia. In 2017 she won the gold medal in the rowing competition at the Central American Games in Managua (2017).

References

1997 births
Living people
People from Granada, Nicaragua
Rowers at the 2020 Summer Olympics
Nicaraguan female rowers
Olympic rowers of Nicaragua
Pan American Games competitors for Nicaragua
Rowers at the 2015 Pan American Games
Rowers at the 2019 Pan American Games